Cylindera is a subgenus of the genus Cylindera. It is one of the largest subgenera in the Cylindera genus.

References

Insect subgenera